The 1960–61 Divizia A was the forty-third season of Divizia A, the top-level football league of Romania.

Teams

League table

Results

Top goalscorers

Champion squad

See also 

 1960–61 Divizia B

References

Liga I seasons
Romania
1960–61 in Romanian football